Fairfield is a city in Clay County, Nebraska, United States. The population was 387 at the 2010 census. It is part of the Hastings, Nebraska Micropolitan Statistical Area.

History
Fairfield got its start in 1872 with the construction of the railroad through the territory.

Geography
Fairfield is located at  (40.432029, -98.104889).

The city is located at 40.43202 N, 98.10324 W.

Demographics

2010 census
As of the census of 2010, there were 387 people, 155 households, and 109 families living in the city. The racial makeup of the city was 99.2% White, 0.3% Native American, and 0.5% from two or more races. Hispanic or Latino people of any race were 0.8% of the population.

There were 155 households, of which 34.2% had children under the age of 18 living with them, 50.3% were married couples living together, 11.6% had a female householder with no husband present, 8.4% had a male householder with no wife present, and 29.7% were non-families. 27.1% of all households were made up of individuals, and 11.6% had someone living alone who was 65 years of age or older. The average household size was 2.50 and the average family size was 3.00.

The median age in the city was 40 years. 27.4% of residents were under the age of 18; 6.5% were between the ages of 18 and 24; 20.3% were from 25 to 44; 29.4% were from 45 to 64; and 16.3% were 65 years of age or older. The gender makeup of the city was 51.2% male and 48.8% female.

2000 census
As of the census of 2000, there were 467 people, 185 households, and 132 families living in the city. The population density was 639.1 people per square mile (247.0/km2). There were 213 housing units at an average density of 291.5 per square mile (112.7/km2). The racial makeup of the city was 98.29% White, 0.21% African American, 0.21% Native American, and 1.28% from two or more races. Hispanic or Latino people of any race were 1.71% of the population.

There were 185 households, out of which 30.8% had children under the age of 18 living with them, 61.6% were married couples living together, 6.5% had a female householder with no husband present, and 28.6% were non-families. 25.9% of all households were made up of individuals, and 14.1% had someone living alone who was 65 years of age or older. The average household size was 2.52 and the average family size was 3.01.

In the city, the population was spread out, with 27.8% under the age of 18, 4.1% from 18 to 24, 27.6% from 25 to 44, 20.8% from 45 to 64, and 19.7% who were 65 years of age or older. The median age was 41 years. For every 100 females, there were 94.6 males. For every 100 females age 18 and over, there were 92.6 males.

The median income for a household in the city was $31,477, and the median income for a family was $37,000. Males had a median income of $26,806 versus $19,063 for females. The per capita income for the city was $15,815. About 12.3% of families and 15.3% of the population were below the poverty line, including 11.5% of those under age 18 and 12.1% of those age 65 or over.

Education
Public education is provided by the South Central Nebraska Unified School District. The schools  in the city are Sandy Creek Jr/Sr High School and Sandy Creek Elementary School.

Notable person
 Samuel Roy McKelvie, 19th Governor of Nebraska and the 13th Lieutenant Governor of Nebraska; born in Fairfield

References

Cities in Nebraska
Cities in Clay County, Nebraska
Hastings Micropolitan Statistical Area